Jayden Hunt (born 3 April 1995) is a professional Australian rules footballer playing for the West Coast Eagles in the Australian Football League (AFL), having previously played for the Melbourne Football Club. He was born into an Australian rules football family with both his great-uncle and uncle playing in the Victorian Football League (now the Australian Football League). He played his final junior football year in school sports and did not play any football at under-18 level. Despite this, he was recruited by the Melbourne Football Club with the fifty-seventh selection in the 2013 AFL draft. After persistent injuries in his first two years, he made his AFL debut during the 2016 season.

Early life
Hunt was born into a football family with his great uncle, Harold Rumney, playing 186 games in the Victorian Football League (now the Australian Football League) for the Collingwood Football Club and Carlton Football Club, including four premierships with Collingwood between 1927 and 1930; and his uncle, Andrew Moir, played 73 matches for the Melbourne Football Club from 1977–1981. He played under 16 level football with the Hampton Rovers Football Club in 2011 before playing school football with Brighton Grammar School. Playing in the Associated Public Schools of Victoria (APS) competition during his draft year, he did not play in the TAC Cup or under 18 championships that year. His only representative match for the year was the APS vs. Associated Grammar Schools of Victoria (AGSV) match.

AFL career

Playing just the one representative match for the year, Hunt was drafted by the Melbourne Football Club with their third selection and fifty-seventh overall in the 2013 national draft, he was the only player in the draft to not play any football at under 18-level. He was labelled as the draft smoky and Herald Sun journalist, Sam Landsberger, noted he was "plucked from relative obscurity". After playing the first six matches in the Victorian Football League (VFL) for Melbourne's affiliate team, the Casey Scorpions in 2014, he was sidelined for over a year after suffering from a back injury and a broken jaw which he injured in June 2015. He returned to the VFL in July and played the remainder of the season including the elimination final loss against .

Hunt had his first uninterrupted pre-season in the lead-up to the 2016 season and played the first two matches of the NAB Challenge. He made his AFL debut in the thirty-five point win against  in round four at the Melbourne Cricket Ground. Regarded for his speed, he received high praise during his eleventh match in round fifteen against , which was described as his break-out match by Fox Sports Australia journalist, Julian De Stoop, and then-Melbourne coach, Paul Roos, stated it was "as good a 12-possession game as [he'd] ever seen". The next week, he recorded a then-career-high twenty-nine disposals and eight inside-50s in the thirty-two point win against  at TIO Stadium. Despite being eligible for the AFL Rising Star, he entered the final round of the season without a nomination, which caused Paul Roos to criticise the Rising Star process, stating "it would be a travesty if he did not receive a nomination" and proclaim he "could be the best young player in the competition". He ultimately missed out on a nomination, which led to Fox Sports Australia naming him the unluckiest player to miss a nomination. He did not miss a match following his debut and he finished with nineteen matches for the season. His season was rewarded with the Harold Ball Memorial Trophy as Melbourne's best young player, and an eleventh-place finish in the best and fairest count.

Hunt struggled to maintain a place in the Melbourne side over the following years, only being listed as an emergency in Melbourne's 2021 grand final win.

Statistics
Updated to the end of the 2022 season.

|-
| 2014 ||  || 29
| 0 || — || — || — || — || — || — || — || — || — || — || — || — || — || —
|-
| 2015 ||  || 29
| 0 || — || — || — || — || — || — || — || — || — || — || — || — || — || —
|-
| 2016 ||  || 29
| 19 || 3 || 1 || 159 || 137 || 296 || 59 || 41 || 0.2 || 0.1 || 8.4 || 7.2 || 15.6 || 3.1 || 2.2 
|-
| 2017 ||  || 29
| 22 || 7 || 5 || 254 || 142 || 396 || 85 || 69 || 0.3 || 0.2 || 11.5 || 6.5 || 18.0 || 3.9 || 3.1
|-
| 2018 ||  || 29
| 6 || 0 || 2 || 49 || 22 || 71 || 22 || 14 || 0.0 || 0.3 || 8.2 || 3.7 || 11.8 || 3.7 || 2.3
|-
| 2019 ||  || 29
| 21 || 21 || 10 || 157 || 95 || 252 || 77 || 46 || 1.0 || 0.5 || 7.5 || 4.5 || 12.0 || 3.7 || 2.2
|-
| 2020 ||  || 29
| 6 || 10 || 2 || 27 || 8 || 35 || 10 || 7 || 1.7 || 0.3 || 4.5 || 1.3 || 5.8 || 1.7 || 1.2
|-
| 2021 ||  || 29
| 20 || 2 || 3 || 179 || 95 || 274 || 64 || 49 || 0.1 || 0.2 || 9.0 || 4.8 || 13.7 || 3.2 || 2.5
|-
| 2022 ||  || 29
| 20 || 0 || 2 || 134 || 66 || 200 || 52 || 27 || 0.0 || 0.1 || 6.7 || 3.3 || 10.0 || 2.6 || 1.4
|- class=sortbottom
! colspan=3 | Career
! 114 !! 43 !! 25 !! 959 !! 565 !! 1524 !! 369 !! 253 !! 0.4 !! 0.2 !! 8.4 !! 5.0 !! 13.4 !! 3.2 !! 2.2
|}

Notes

Honours and achievements
Team
 McClelland Trophy: 2021

Individual
 Harold Ball Memorial Trophy: 2016
 22under22 team: 2017

References

External links

1995 births
Living people
Melbourne Football Club players
Australian rules footballers from Victoria (Australia)
People educated at Brighton Grammar School
Casey Demons players